Southland is an electorate to the New Zealand House of Representatives. It was first created for the 2020 New Zealand general election and has since then been held by Joseph Mooney of the National Party.

Population centres
Despite its name, the electorate straddles the border between the Southland and Otago regions. It is one of New Zealand's largest electorates and is predominantly rural in nature. The electorate includes Gore, Winton, Mataura, Alexandra, Arrowtown, Queenstown and Te Anau (among others), and much of Fiordland National Park.

History
The Southland electorate emerged at the 2020 redistribution after the Clutha region moved out of the former electorate of Clutha-Southland. The Representation Commission initially proposed to move Winton and The Catlins into , but after a public consultation process these areas remained in Southland, which instead shed a large area in West Southland around Tuatapere.

The incumbent from the Clutha-Southland electorate, Hamish Walker, announced in July 2020 that he would not contest the Southland electorate. Later that month, the National Party selected Joseph Mooney as their candidate for this safe National seat. Mooney was elected by a margin of 5,645 votes over Labour Party candidate Jon Mitchell.

Members of Parliament
Key

Election results

2020 election

References

2020 establishments in New Zealand
New Zealand electorates